Guy III may refer to:

 Guy III of Châtillon (1254–1317)
 Guy III of Spoleto (died 894)
 Guy III, Count of Saint-Pol (died 1289)

Other
 Guy III (album), from American R&B group Guy